Nalan may refer to: 
Nalan Xingde (1655–1685), Qing dynasty Chinese poet
Nalan Ramazanoğlu (born 1980), Turkish basketball player
Nalan (singer) (Nalan Tokyürek), Turkish singer
Nalan Mingzhu, an official of the Qing Dynasty
Nalan Minghui, a character in Qijian Xia Tianshan
Nalan Cheel, a member of Figrin D'an and the Modal Nodes
Nalan Kumarasamy, Indian film director

See also
 Nala (sometimes called Nalan), a character in Hindu mythology

Turkish feminine given names